Zare is a village in the Karmala taluka of Solapur district in Maharashtra state, India.

Demographics
Covering  and comprising 729 households at the time of the 2011 census of India, Zare had a population of 3140. There were 1644 males and 1496 females, with 348 people being aged six or younger.

References

Villages in Karmala taluka